Andrew Rozdilsky Jr. (December 6, 1917 – September 21, 1995), best known by the stage name Andy the Clown, was a lifelong Chicago resident who performed, unofficially, as a clown at Chicago White Sox games at Comiskey Park for 30 years from 1960 to 1990.

Early life
The youngest of five sons and one daughter, Rozdilsky first began performing as a clown when he was 10 years old. After serving in the Army during World War II, he began working as a research clerk for International Harvester, while continuing to perform as a clown at family and neighborhood events.

First appearance
In , during the period that the Sox were owned by Bill Veeck, Rozdilsky was invited to a White Sox game by several friends, and decided to wear his clown costume to the game; the crowd responded with strong encouragement, and after he won a pair of season tickets in a local Knights of Columbus raffle, he began performing at all home games beginning with the 1961 season.

Distinctive costume
Andy was always prominent at Comiskey Park, easily spotted in his bowler hat, black-rimmed glasses and polka-dotted costume with a ruffled collar, and easily heard crying out his trademark cheer, an elongated "Gooooo yooooouuuu Whiiiiite Sooooox!" But his most distinctive and well-known feature was his large red nose, which lit up whenever he shook hands with a child. Over the years, Andy became a beloved fixture at White Sox games, continuing to perform after Veeck sold the team in 1961 to brothers Arthur and John Allyn, and also after Veeck re-purchased the team in 1975; the team never made Andy an official employee, but did provide him with free admission. He also made unofficial appearances at hospitals and charity events.

Andy could display an impish sense of humor, as at the exhibition game in August 1981 against the Cubs; he sat down in Mayor Jane Byrne's lap, lit up his nose, turned to her husband and said, "Jay, your wife is turning me on." He also overcame illnesses to make it to games, as in 1983 when he was at the park just one hour after being released from a four-day hospital stay for a bleeding ulcer.

Historical trends
Andy was a transitional figure between eras in entertainment at major league ballparks,  being the last in a generation of clowns who appeared regularly in the majors; Al Schacht was retired, Max Patkin was by now performing primarily in the minor leagues, and legendary Ringling Bros. clown Emmett Kelly, who often performed at Brooklyn Dodgers games in the 1940s and 1950s, died in 1979. In the 1970s, the trend toward costumed team mascots began, primarily with the first appearances of The San Diego Chicken in 1974 and the Phillie Phanatic in 1978.

Decade of changes
In 1981, the White Sox were sold to an ownership group headed by Jerry Reinsdorf and Eddie Einhorn, and the new owners were eager to bring in a new mascot, seeking to improve what they perceived to be a more downscale feature of White Sox home games. They hired the design firm responsible for creating the Phillie Phanatic to create a new mascot for the Sox, and in August 1981 informed Andy that he could no longer appear at games in costume. The response from the fans and local media was immediate and solidly opposed to this decision, and a telephone campaign insisting on Andy's reinstatement succeeded in getting the team to rescind its decision just one day after it was announced. A compromise was reached in which Andy would continue to be allowed in the ballpark in costume, but he would not be permitted to go into the lower grandstand, staying only in the upper deck and concourse areas of the park.

Days later, the Sox debuted the pair of furry mascots created for them, Ribbie and Roobarb; but the fans never accepted the two, ridiculing them throughout their tenure with the team – both because of their ludicrous appearance, which had no apparent connection with the team, and also because they were seen as an attempt by the team to eliminate Andy. Fans openly mocked Ribbie and Roobarb, with even children gleefully attacking them, while the fans in the box seats found ways of getting around the restrictions on Andy by constantly bringing him into the lower grandstand and seeking him out elsewhere in the park. The team stopped using Ribbie and Roobarb after the 1988 season.

The decision brought to a close an era in Chicago sports. Upon retiring him, the team presented Andy with a commemorative plaque – though he remarked in a radio interview the next morning that he wished they had given him something more memorable, "like a Zenith TV or something." Listeners were so grateful for his years at the ballpark that they donated gifts of two televisions, a reclining chair, free repair services and gifts for his family. Once the new ballpark opened, Andy attended occasional games out of costume (but with his hat), cheering as always; but team management was upset that he would accept tips from fans when posing for photos, and told him that he couldn't do so anymore. He rarely attended games afterward, but still made other unofficial appearances.

Legacy and death
In his 30 years of performing at White Sox games, Andy only missed one home opener – that of April 14, 1989, which occurred one day after the death of his wife, the former Helen Novak. Rozdilsky died at age 77 after suffering a heart attack at his Southwest Side home, and was buried in Evergreen Cemetery in Evergreen Park.

Quote
 "This was in the days when sporting events came without soundtracks and audiovisual displays, before the franchises felt the need to fill every single break in the action with canned music and furry-costumed gymnasts and wriggling cheerleaders and audience-participation stunts. ... What was cool about Andy was that he just showed up, and the White Sox just sort of tolerated him. He wasn't a graduate of Mascot School, which is a real place." – Richard Roeper

See also
Ronnie Woo Woo
Robert Szasz
Robin Ficker
Wild Bill Hagy

References
 Roeper, Richard (September 25, 1995). "There Were Clowns, But Only One Andy". Chicago Sun-Times, p. 11.

1917 births
1995 deaths
American clowns
United States Army personnel of World War II
Chicago White Sox
Major League Baseball team mascots
People from Chicago
United States Army soldiers